The Roman Catholic Diocese of San Pedro de Macorís (erected 1 February 1997) is a suffragan diocese of the Archdiocese of Santo Domingo.

Ordinaries 
 Francisco Ozoria Acosta (1 February 1997 – 2016), appointed Archbishop of Santo Domingo
 Santiago Rodríguez Rodríguez (2017 - )

References

External links 
 

San Pedro de Macorís
San Pedro de Macoris
San Pedro de Macoris
San Pedro de Macoris
San Pedro de Macoris, Roman Catholic Diocese of